The Autopista C-33 is a highway in Catalonia.

It connects the Autopista AP-7 north of Barcelona to the City Centre and the Autovía C-17.

For the 1992 Summer Olympics when the highway was known as A-17, it was used as part of the road team time trial cycling event that started and ended at the Circuit de Catalunya.

References

Venues of the 1992 Summer Olympics
C-33
Olympic cycling venues